USS Mattabesett or Mattabesset may refer to the following ships of the United States Navy:

 , a schooner-rigged, wooden hulled, double-ended, sidewheel gunboat that served from 1864 until 1865
 , a gasoline tanker, that served from 1945 until 1968

United States Navy ship names